is a fictional character in Capcom's Street Fighter series of fighting games. He debuted as one of the original eight World Warriors in 1991's Street Fighter II and appeared in the game's subsequent updates. In the games he is portrayed as a major in the United States Air Force who is seeking to avenge the death of his Air Force buddy Charlie at the hands of the villainous dictator M. Bison.

One of the most popular characters in the series, Guile has appeared in other Street Fighter games, including the home port versions of Street Fighter Alpha 3 (where he is a playable character alongside Charlie), and Street Fighter IV. He is also a playable character in various spin-off titles, such as the Street Fighter EX, Marvel vs. Capcom 2, and SNK vs. Capcom series.

Guile has also appeared in other Street Fighter media: one of the main characters in the 1994 live action Street Fighter film and its animated spin-off, as well as Street Fighter II: The Animated Movie. The character has also been featured in various official comics and merchandise. His music theme, known simply as "Guile's Theme", has been used multiple times, usually to give a sense of victory.

Guile has been perceived as unique among Street Fighter II characters in both appearance and gameplay. He is noted as having only two signature moves in the game, both of which are performed by first holding a direction on the joystick and then pushing in the opposite direction with a punch or kick - the Sonic Boom and the Flash Kick, respectively. Guile has been well received, with the character often placing highly in various lists of the best Street Fighter characters of all time.

Character

Creation
Designed by "Pigmon-san" and Akira "Akiman" Yasuda, the original character concept in an early 1988 pitch design starting out as a USMC commando-sweater wearing, American war-veteran named Shilke Muller (German: Schilke Müller), he earned the nickname Killing Machine due to how savage, intelligent, and formidable he is as a warrior; a former Green Beret with a high IQ of 220 that is superhuman enough for him to be able to completely read the minds of his enemies, has lightning-fast movements, and his special move is the Jumping Hundred Crack Knife. 

He was most likely to replace Street Fighter I's ninja Geki and appears to be inspired off of the minor antagonist Narumi from the manga Riki-Oh, both characters being spiky-haired fighters, with savage personalities, who have habits of licking their own knives. 

Shilke is also oddly named after the female sprinter of East-Germany Silke Möller. The likenesses would later be passed down to the Mad Gear Gang's fourth ringleader Rolento Schugerg and his foot-soldier goons El Gado and Holly Wood in an up-and-coming spin-off brawler that Capcom would release a year later briefly titled during development as Street Fighter '89, as the character would also have a weaponless moveset and a more unique appearance renamed as Major Guile.

Design
Early Street Fighter II sketches and notes suggest that Guile was developed specifically to appeal to American fans. In an interview with Game On!, Capcom Research and Design head Noritaka Funamizu stated that of the more popular characters in the series with western audiences, Guile was most likely considered the game's main character. His physical appearance is strikingly different from the many Asian characters in the Street Fighter series, with light blue eyes, a chiseled jaw, and a blonde and particularly tall flattop haircut. The length of Guile's hair varies from appearance to appearance.

Capcom sourcebooks suggest that Guile's famous hairdo is styled with a special-order army hair spray to keep it up (though he ends up fixing it quickly after a match). Another way Guile's image differs from the Asian combatants in the series is his American flag tattoos. Finally, Guile's military fatigues complete his all-American look. He wears Charlie's dog tag alongside his own as he searches for Bison. Guile's design and hairstyle is based on Rudol von Stroheim, a character from the manga JoJo's Bizarre Adventure.

Appearances

In video games
Guile first appears in Street Fighter II (1991) as one of the eight selectable characters featured in the first release of the game. The former elite SOF  teammate from the United States, Guile along with his best friend and co-pilot Charlie Nash were missing in action during a mission in Shadaloo, Thailand six years prior in 1987 during the events where Ryu fights Sagat in the Street Fighter I tournament. After many months of being Shadaloo POWs in Cambodia, he and Nash have succeeded their prison break from their cell to escape the jungle camps. During their perilous trek to civilization, Guile witnessed the ambush and murder of Nash at the nefarious hands of a caped dictator in a red uniform, this has stricken Guile with grief and vengeance ever since. In the present year of 1993, Guile is now affiliated with the USAF under the rank of Major, and has deserted both his wife, his daughter, and his nation for the opportunity to compete in the World Warrior tournament as an opportunity to avenge Nash against the sponsor of the competition. In his ending, he defeats Bison and lifts him on his knees by his throat to finish him off just after reminding him of who he murdered, but is dissuaded from killing him by his wife Julia (Jane in Japan) and their daughter Amy (Chris in Japan), he then spares the bruised and bloody Bison and returns to his country to spend Christmas with his family.

Guile's war buddy Charlie would appear in the later prequel series Street Fighter Alpha, although Guile himself did not appear in this sub-series until the console versions of Street Fighter Alpha 3 (1998). They originally made Guile a hidden character in the initial PlayStation version of the game, though subsequent versions made him part of the initial roster. In his storyline in the game, Guile is an Air Force JTAC/TACP ordered to track down Charlie, who has gone missing. Guile eventually fights Charlie, as well as Bison as his final opponent.  In his ending, Guile infiltrates Bison's base with Charlie and sets explosives on the Psycho Drive, only for the two to be caught in the act by Bison. Charlie holds off Bison while Guile escapes and the base explodes with Charlie still in it, resulting in his death. This ending, however, is retconned by Street Fighter V, which portrays Charlie's death in Street Fighter Alpha 2 at the hands of his own men secretly working for M. Bison as official canon.

Guile also appears as a playable character in Street Fighter EX (1997) and its two sequels, Street Fighter EX2 (1998) and Street Fighter EX3 (2000). The storyline of the EX series takes place at the same time as Street Fighter II. In addition to tracking down Shadaloo to avenge Charlie, Guile is also hunted by a mercenary named Doctrine Dark (another playable character in this sub-series), who is actually a former subordinate named Holger. His relationship with Ken as brothers-in-law (with their respective wives being sisters) is mentioned for the first time in the games in Ken's ending in the Japanese version of the original EX2.

Guile returns as a playable character in Street Fighter IV (2008), where he seeks authorization to conduct a search for his friend and comrade Charlie, whom he believes to be missing, but his request is rejected by his superior as he gives Guile a dog tag that belonged to Charlie and telling Guile to investigate S.I.N. and their connection to Shadaloo. In his Street Fighter IV ending, Guile is searching for Chun-Li after he defeats Seth. However, Seth finds Guile and he was rescued by Abel (who mentioned that he had seen a man (Charlie) that uses Guile's Sonic Boom move), and they were able to rescue Chun-Li. After that, Guile is sent home and reunited with his family. In Super Street Fighter IVs ending, Guile visits Charlie's grave and tells him that Shadaloo's plans are not over yet. Guile has an alternative costume that resembles Charlie's outfit in Street Fighter IV omega mode.

Guile also appears as a supporting character in the crossover fighting game Street Fighter X Tekken (2012), with Abel as his official tag partner.

Guile returns as the first of the delayed characters in Street Fighter V (2016–2022), as one of 6 DLC characters that were released after the game's launch in 2016. During Shadaloo's final scheme under a Black Moon-based Operation C.H.A.I.N.S., Guile suddenly encounters Charlie, who was resurrected by an unknown assailant (Illuminati), and joined the said third party side, despite their motives for Shadaloo's downfall are same. After Charlie cures Abel of M. Bison's Psycho Power, Guile reconciles with his undead friend. Guile joins the heroes who Karin recruited who join a final assault against the Shadaloo, with the help of a group of heroes who are recruited by an unknown assailant such as Charlie himself and Cammy, as well as a Middle East fighter Rashid, including Juri. While Rashid managed to shutdown Shadaloo's Operation C.H.A.I.N.S, Guile, Ryu, and Chun-Li watch Charlie a final time where the latter sacrifices his life to weaken M. Bison, with Ryu finishes his job to destroy M. Bison. Now finally at peace and becomes a national hero, Guile decides to retire from fighting to be with his family and become a mentor of the son of late-Robert Sullivan, Luke. Because the military which Luke joined in does not grant him the satisfaction to honor his late father, Guile convinces the military to release Luke from the army and advises the young man to pursue competitive fighting circuits across the globe and fight stronger opponents there, allowing Luke to become an independent man like his father before him.

As Guile was absent from Street Fighter III, which took place several years after Street Fighter V, Guile returns in Street Fighter 6 (2023), which itself takes place after Street Fighter III.

Guile appears in both the arcade and home versions of Street Fighter: The Movie, which were two separately-produced 1995 fighting games that used digitized footage from the live-action Street Fighter film, in which Guile was the lead character. Actor Jean-Claude Van Damme posed for Guile's animation frames in the game.

The Alpha 3 incarnation of Guile appears as a selectable character in several fighting game crossovers which including Marvel vs. Capcom 2 (2000), Capcom vs. SNK (2000), Capcom vs. SNK 2 (2001) and Capcom Fighting Jam (2003). He also appears in the SNK-produced installments of SNK/Capcom crossovers in SNK vs. Capcom: Match of the Millennium (1999), SNK vs. Capcom: SVC Chaos (2003) and the SNK vs. Capcom: Card Fighters Clash series. A super-deformed version of the character is playable in the mobile puzzle game Street Fighter: Puzzle Spirits (2014).

Guile appears in Charlie's ending in X-Men vs. Street Fighter (he is not identified by name, only as "Charlie's friend"), swearing revenge on Bison for apparently killing Charlie. A Guile-inspired costume for players to use in Sony's LittleBigPlanet was released as downloadable content. Guile appears as an assist trophy in Super Smash Bros. Ultimate, using Flash Kick and Sonic Boom. Guile was also added to Fortnite Battle Royale, along with Cammy on August 3, 2021.

The English version of Saturday Night Slam Masters implies that the character Gunloc is related to Guile. The video game adaptations of Street Fighter: The Movie expand on this, stating that Gunloc is Guile's brother.

In other media

In the 1994 live-action Street Fighter film, Guile (given the full name of William F. Guile) is played by Jean-Claude Van Damme and is the main protagonist instead of Ryu and Ken Masters, to appeal to American viewers and for high-grossing purposes. Van Damme's line in the film, "Are you man enough to fight with me?", is taken from Street Fighter II and its follow-ups. His character is given the rank of Colonel. In this live adaption, Guile is commanding the A.N. (this film's version of the United Nations) forces as he searches for General M. Bison. His motivation for searching for Bison is not to avenge Charlie's death, but to end Bison's corrupt organization and to rescue Charlie, although he receives a great deal of help from Ryu and Ken to find Bison's base, and is aided in his mission by Chun-Li, Cammy White, T. Hawk, Balrog, E. Honda and Zangief. Jean-Claude Van Damme's hair lacked the three-inch blonde flattop from the games as it is instead a bleached and gelled strawberry-blonde blowout hairdo, and even though the character was portrayed as American, Van Damme's Belgian accent was very noticeable, which implies that he is French-American. Van Damme, also put no effort into using the same fighting styles as Guile who uses a southpaw stance and is skilled in both Kickboxing and Wrestling moves as seen in the games, instead the actor uses a front stance and fights with Taekwando throughout his entire fight scenes just like in most of his films.

Van Damme was approached to reprise the role in the reboot, Street Fighter: The Legend of Chun-Li, but ultimately did not appear.

Guile was planned to appear in the second season of Street Fighter: Assassin's Fist, titled Street Fighter: World Warrior; series creator Joey Ansah was interested in casting Scott Adkins as Guile. Assassin's Fist was eventually scrapped in favor of Street Fighter: Resurrection; Guile was mentioned by Ken in the Resurrection episode "Fight & Flight" but did not appear in the series.

Guile is one of the main characters in the 1994 anime film Street Fighter II: The Animated Movie, where he is voiced by Masane Tsukayama in the Japanese original and by Kirk Thornton (credited as Donald Lee) in the English dub. Guile, serving as a jet fighter pilot and ranked as a Major (O-4) in the U.S. Air Force, is assigned to work together with Chun-Li in order to take down Bison, whose organization Shadaloo (Shadowlaw in the English dub) has been kidnapping several martial artists and brainwashing them to do his evil bidding. Guile is at first far from happy to work with another person on the case, claiming loudly that "Bison's ass is mine", but a "special" friendship builds up between him and the Interpol agent. The film follows Guile's plot from the video game in Guile tracking down Bison to avenge Charlie's death, and his vendetta is amplified when Chun-Li is hospitalized by Vega on Bison's orders (though Chun-Li manages to defeat Vega first). Near the end of the film, Guile manages to track Ryu down but is followed by Bison and a brainwashed Ken. Guile engages Bison in combat but is outmatched by the crime lord's overwhelming speed and only manages to damage his cape with a Sonic Boom. Bison then finishes the fight by blasting Guile down a chasm. Guile survives this, although exhausted and bloodied, and when Bison finds Guile, he decides to spare him as an insult, and leaves. Guile is rescued along with Balrog by E. Honda. In his final scene, Guile, fully recovered, is moved to tears when informed that Chun-Li survived Vega's attack.

Based loosely on the storyline of the 1994 film while combining elements from Street Fighter II, Guile serves as the main protagonist of the Street Fighter animated series, and is depicted as the leader of an organization of Street Fighters consisting of himself, Chun-Li, Blanka, Ryu, Ken, T. Hawk, Cammy, Dee Jay, Fei Long and Dhalsim. Bison has survived his battle with Guile following the events of the film, and Guile's sole goal is to destroy Bison once and for all. The cartoon ran for two seasons (October 21, 1995 – May 14, 1997) with a total of 26 episodes.

Guile appears in the 1995 anime series Street Fighter II V, where he is voiced by Tesshō Genda in the Japanese original and once again by Kirk Thornton in the English Amimaze dub and by Rob Mungle in the ADV Films dub. In this TV series, Guile is a Master Sergeant (E-7) in the U.S. Air Force, who spends most of his time training physically and who has great pride in the Air Force. He faces Ryu in a bar fight after Ryu and Ken beat up some of his men (although it was Guile's men who started the fight in the first place when Ken stole one of their dates). Guile easily defeats Ryu, only to face Ken, who challenges him in an air force base to avenge Ryu. Despite a severe hangover, Guile is able to defeat Ken, which motivates the duo to start a training journey and improve their martial art skills by challenging opponents around the world. While in India, Ryu fights an imaginary Guile during a training session, but stops the fight and acknowledges his respect for the Sergeant for showing them how arrogant they were and inspiring them to travel the world. Later in the series, Guile is recruited by Ken's father along with his friend Charlie (who retains his Japanese name, Nash, in the dub) when Ryu, Ken and Chun-Li are taken captive by Shadaloo. He faces Zangief while infiltrating Bison's base, while Nash confronts Bison himself. Guile knocks Zangief out, but is unable to save Nash from Bison, who pits a brainwashed Chun-Li against the enraged Sergeant. Outside, Guile fights Chun-Li until Bison's demise snaps her out of her brainwashing, and he is last seen showing admiration for Ryu and Ken when they emerge unharmed from the battlefield.

In UDON's Street Fighter comic adaptation, Guile is given a central role alongside Chun-Li, particularly in the first arc but he also is a frequent cast member in later arcs. Similar to the official story, Guile is chasing after Shadaloo to discover the whereabouts of his Air Force buddy, Charlie Nash. Guile is first introduced to Charlie after his aircraft is shot down and Charlie commands a black-ops mission to rescue him. Like the official story, Charlie teaches Guile to fight. For the first arc of the comics, Guile spends his time looking for Ryu, believing to there to be a connection between him and Shadaloo. He traces him to the US and then back to Japan. While in Japan, he and Chun-Li engage a Shadaloo-controlled Charlie (codenamed "Agent Shadow") and fight him off. At the end of the first story arc, Charlie regains his senses and rejoins Chun-Li and Guile before they're attacked by M. Bison. Charlie unleashes his latent Psycho Power abilities and sacrifices himself to take out Bison (Charlie giving his own life to stop Bison echoes Guile's ending in Street Fighter Alpha 3), leaving Guile distraught and swearing vengeance against Shadaloo. Afterwards, Guile continues to assist Chun-Li in looking for Bison (whom they believe survived his encounter with Charlie) but all the while juggling his struggling relationship with his wife, Julia, and their daughter, Amy. Eventually the family reconciles at the end of the comic's second arc. Guile isn't heavily active during the second series of comics (Street Fighter II) but he is given an invitation to Bison's tournament, which he accepts as his final bid for vengeance. The final series (Street Fighter II Turbo) documents Guile's entry into M. Bison's fighting tournament. While on Shadaloo island, he is contacted by Cammy, who needs his help but cannot openly assist him as she is attempting to fool Bison into thinking she is under his control. Through a carefully woven set of scripted matches, Guile and Chun-Li get themselves eliminated from the tournament and successfully free the Delta Red squadron. Together they manage to locate and destroy Bison's Psycho Drive before evacuating the island as it sinks. The aftermath of the tournament show that Guile is satisfied with the results, believing he has successfully avenged Charlie, and is now comfortably living with his family.

Guile also appears alongside other Street Fighter characters in the Archie Comics crossover event Worlds Unite, which featured various Capcom and Sega franchises guest-starring in the Sonic the Hedgehog, Sonic Universe, Mega Man, and Sonic Boom comics.

Reception
Video game publications have commented on Guile, giving mostly positive opinions. 8-Bit Theater author Brian Clevinger once described Guile as "the epitome of everything discussed in The Art of War". IGN ranked him at number two in their "Top 25 Street Fighter Characters" article, stating "there's nothing too fancy about him. He's just your basic, no-nonsense, all-American tough guy." Guile has also ranked tenth in ScrewAttack's "Top Ten Coolest Characters". GameDaily listed him at number ten on their "Top 20 Street Fighter Characters of All Time" article, voicing disapproval for Jean-Claude Van Damme's portrayal of him in the live action film. IGN gave similar comments labelling such portrayal as "What Went Wrong" in an article about gaming heroes. GameDaily additionally named him one of their favorite Capcom characters of all time, praising his hairstyle as one of the weirdest in gaming by stating "It's not big, puffy and round, but big, puffy and MIGHTY." In the February 1992 issue of Gamest magazine in Japan, Guile ranked at No. 4 in the list of Best Characters of 1991. Luke Plunkett of Kotaku has criticized Guile's design from Fortnite by claiming that the design was "weird", and also stated that "this Fortnite version of Guile does not look like Guile. The uniform checks out, the overall silhouette of the man checks out, but instead of looking like a “very animated 80s GI Joe action figure”."

Writing for The Guardian, Ryan Hart listed Guile as the fourteenth-best Street Fighter character, placing Charlie in a higher spot when comparing their movesets. Alongside Hart, UGO Networks's Paul Furfari commented that Guile was one of the most important characters from the series behind Ryu and Ken. They also listed him eleventh on their list of "Top 50 Street Fighter Characters". His movesets were noted for having only two special techniques which required players to take a defensive style with Guile found to be one of the first characters from the franchise with charged moves. For the crossover game Street Fighter X Tekken, GamesRadar listed Paul Phoenix as an opponent they wanted Guile to face owing to their similar hairstyle.

Patrick Hancock of Destructoid dislikes Guile due to being a "charge character". Hancock stated "The quintessential charge character has to be Guile. When I picture Guile, I picture him squatting down, waiting for the opponent to make any sort of move that he can punish with a Flash Kick or one of his strong normals." Hancock praises some of his moves, however.

The theme tune for Guile, composed by Yoko Shimomura, specifically the version from the CP System II release of Super Street Fighter II, is the subject of a mashup internet phenomenon named "Guile's Theme Goes With Everything", in which the music is perceived to synchronize with clips from films and other media, regardless of their content.

Guile has also appeared in the manga Hi Score Girl by Rensuke Oshikiri. The series' main character, Haruo Yaguchi, is a fan of Street Fighter II and always plays as Guile. This tends to be exaggerated to the point Haruo suffers from hallucinations where he talks to Guile while playing the game or interacting with other gamers.

References

Action film characters
Capcom protagonists
Fictional American people in video games
Fictional aviators
Fictional European-American people
Fictional martial artists in video games
Fictional fighter pilots
Fictional kickboxers
Fictional lieutenants
Fictional majors
Fictional MCMAP practitioners
Fictional special forces personnel
Fictional United States Air Force personnel
Internet memes
Male characters in video games
Fictional military personnel in video games
Fictional soldiers in video games
Street Fighter characters
Power Rangers characters
United States-themed superheroes
Video game characters introduced in 1991
Video game characters with air or wind abilities
Video game memes